In the sport of baseball, a loss is a statistic credited to the pitcher of the losing team responsible for the run that gives the opposing team the lead with which the game is won (the go-ahead run). The losing pitcher is the pitcher responsible for the go-ahead run to reach base for a lead that the winning team never relinquishes. If a pitcher allows a run which gives the opposing team the lead, his team comes back to lead or tie the game, and then the opposing team regains the lead against a subsequent pitcher, the earlier pitcher does not get the loss.

Cy Young holds the MLB loss record with 316; Pud Galvin is second with 308. Young and Galvin are the only players to earn 300 or more losses.

Key

List

See also
Baseball statistics
List of Major League Baseball career wins leaders
List of Major League Baseball career games started leaders
List of Major League Baseball career games finished leaders

Sources
Baseball-Reference.com

Losses leaders